This is a list of franchise records for the Toronto Maple Leafs of the National Hockey League.

Franchise records

Franchise single season 

 † Ties are no longer an official NHL statistic since the end of the 2003–04 NHL season.
 ‡ Overtime losses became an official NHL statistic in the 1999–2000 NHL season and replaced the 'tie' statistic beginning in the 2005–06 NHL season.

Franchise single game 

 † Tied with NHL record

Franchise streaks

Individual records

Career leaders 

Updated to February 18, 2022.

‡ Currently playing for Toronto
† Minimum 50 games played
†† Minimum 500 shots against

Single season leaders 

† Minimum 40% of team's games played
†† Minimum 500 shots against; Save percentage was not recorded until the mid-1950s

Single game leaders

Individual streaks 

† NHL record
‡ Tied with NHL record

References

 Leafs Record Book 1927–2006
 Leafs All-Time Stats Leaders
 Leafs All-Time Scoring Leaders
 Leafs All-Time Coaches and GMs

Records
National Hockey League statistical records
records